Shameless Self-Promotion Is the Sloppy Meateaters' first studio album. The album contained the two original members of the band Josh Chambers (Sloppy Josh) and drummer Kevin Highfield (Sloppy Kevin). Although only two members of the band were recorded on the album the cover of the re-released album contained Travis Gerke who joined the band after the original release.

Track listing 
 Another Friend
 Home
 I Sing Like a Girl
 Explore the Obvious
 A Dumb Guy in a Stupid Band
 Mom
 My Secret Killer
 Outta Control
 What Did We Learn Today?
 Nobody Likes Me
 Hang On to Me
 Shonka Tonk

References

External links
  on Amazon.com

1999 debut albums
Sloppy Meateaters albums